Dual screen may refer to:

 A multi-monitor setup with two monitors
Dual-touchscreen, a display setup for computers or phones
Second screen, a device (e.g. mobile device) providing an enhanced viewing experience for content on another device (e.g. a TV)

See also
Multi-screen (disambiguation)
Computer (disambiguation)
Phone (disambiguation)
Nintendo DS, a dual-screen handheld game console